Penguin Modern Poets was a series of 27 poetry books published by Penguin Books in the 1960s and 1970s, each containing work by three contemporary poets (mostly but not exclusively British and American). The series was begun in 1962 and published an average of two volumes per year throughout the 1960s. Each volume was stated to be "an attempt to introduce contemporary poetry to the general reader". The series added up to a substantial survey of English-language poetry of the time.

Penguin Modern Poets was the first venture on the part of Penguin Books to offer contemporary poetry. Although at the time, most poetry was published in expensive hardbound editions, Penguin Modern Poets offered the public samplers of modern verse in inexpensive paperbacks. No. 27, the last of the original series, appeared in 1979.

The outstanding success of the series was No. 10, which, unlike the others, had its own title (The Mersey Sound) and which, with sales of over 500,000, has become one of the best-selling poetry anthologies ever.

A second Penguin Modern Poets series, of at least thirteen volumes on the same pattern, was launched in the 1990s. A third Penguin Modern Poets series was launched in 2016.

Penguin Modern Poets (first series)
Lawrence Durrell, Elizabeth Jennings, R. S. Thomas — 1962
Kingsley Amis, Dom Moraes, Peter Porter — 1962
George Barker, Martin Bell, Charles Causley
David Holbrook, Christopher Middleton, David Wevill
Gregory Corso, Lawrence Ferlinghetti, Allen Ginsberg
George MacBeth, Edward Lucie-Smith, Jack Clemo
Richard Murphy, Jon Silkin, Nathaniel Tarn
Edwin Brock, Geoffrey Hill, Stevie Smith
Denise Levertov, Kenneth Rexroth, William Carlos Williams
Adrian Henri, Roger McGough, Brian Patten (entitled: The Mersey Sound)
D. M. Black, Peter Redgrove, D. M. Thomas
Alan Jackson, Jeff Nuttall, William Wantling
Charles Bukowski, Philip Lamantia, Harold Norse
Alan Brownjohn, Michael Hamburger, Charles Tomlinson
Alan Bold, Edward Brathwaite, Edwin Morgan
Jack Beeching, Harry Guest, Matthew Mead
W. S. Graham, Kathleen Raine, David Gascoyne
A. Alvarez, Roy Fuller, Anthony Thwaite
John Ashbery, Lee Harwood, Tom Raworth
John Heath-Stubbs, F. T. Prince, Stephen Spender
George Mackay Brown, Norman MacCaig, Iain Crichton Smith
John Fuller, Peter Levi, Adrian Mitchell
Geoffrey Grigson, Edwin Muir, Adrian Stokes
Kenward Elmslie, Kenneth Koch, James Schuyler
Gavin Ewart, Zulfikar Ghose, B. S. Johnson — 1975
Dannie Abse, D.J. Enright, Michael Longley
John Ormond, Emyr Humphreys, John Tripp

Penguin Modern Poets (second series)

James Fenton, Blake Morrison, Kit Wright
Carol Ann Duffy, Vicki Feaver, Eavan Boland
Glyn Maxwell, Mick Imlah, Peter Reading — 1995
Liz Lochhead, Roger McGough, Sharon Olds — 1995
Simon Armitage, Sean O'Brien, Tony Harrison
U. A. Fanthorpe, Elma Mitchell, Charles Causley
Donald Davie, Samuel Menashe, Allen Curnow
Jackie Kay, Merle Collins, Grace Nichols
John Burnside, Robert Crawford, Kathleen Jamie
Douglas Oliver, Denise Riley, Iain Sinclair
Michael Donaghy, Andrew Motion, Hugo Williams — 1997
Helen Dunmore, Jo Shapcott, Matthew Sweeney
Michael Hofmann, Michael Longley, Robin Robertson

Penguin Modern Poets (third series)

Emily Berry, Anne Carson, Sophie Collins (If I'm Scared We Can't Win, 2016)
Michael Robbins, Patricia Lockwood, Timothy Thornton (Controlled Explosions, 2016)
Malika Booker, Sharon Olds, Warsan Shire (Your Family, Your Body, 2017)
Kathleen Jamie, Don Paterson, Nick Laird (Other Ways to Leave the Room, 2017)
Sam Riviere, Frederick Seidel, Kathryn Maris (Occasional Wild Parties, 2017)
Maggie Nelson, Denise Riley, Claudia Rankine (Die Deeper into Life, 2017)
Toby Martinez de las Rivas, Geoffrey Hill, Rowan Evans (These Hard and Shining Things, 2018)

References

External links
 Penguin Archive Project University of Bristol

British poetry collections
Poetry anthologies
Penguin Books book series